is a Prefectural Natural Park in northeast Nara Prefecture, Japan. Established in 1975, the park comprises two non-contiguous areas spanning the borders of the municipalities of Nara and Yamazoe. The plum groves of Tsukigase were designated a Place of Scenic Beauty in 1922. Although a dam constructed in 1964 submerged 3,950 plum trees, subsequent replanting has increased the numbers to 10,000. The area is also celebrated for its azaleas, as is Mount Kōno, which rises to a height of 618.8m.

See also
 National Parks of Japan
 Monuments of Japan

References

External links
  Map of the parks of Nara Prefecture

Parks and gardens in Nara Prefecture
Protected areas established in 1975